Duncan Seth Free  (born 25 May 1973) is a retired Australian rower and Olympic gold medallist. He is dual Olympian and two-time world champion who represented Australia at four world rowing championships in both sculls and sweep oared boats. He was a six-time Australian national sculling champion.

Rowing family
Free was born in Hobart, Tasmania. His father Reg Free rowed in numerous King's Cup crews for Tasmania from 1962 and in 1967, became the first Tasmanian oarsman selected to row in the Australian men's eight when they competed by invitation at the 1967 European Rowing Championships in Vichy, France. The family relocated to Queensland in 1983 and in the next decade Reg Free coached several Queensland King's Cup crews and coached his sons Marcus and Duncan to state, national and international victories.

Club and state rowing
Duncan Free's senior rowing was from the Surfers Paradise Rowing Club in Queensland. Representing that club he raced for the national Australian sculling title at the Australian Rowing Championships for twelve consecutive years from 1993. He won that national title on six occasions.

He was the Queensland state representative sculler picked to race the President's Cup at the Australian Rowing Championships eight times from 1996 to 2004. Coached by his father, he won the interstate championship for Queensland on seven of those occasions.

Free won Diamond Sculls event at the 2001 Henley Royal Regatta racing for the Surfer's Paradise Rowing Club.

National representative rowing
Duncan and his brother Marcus were paired in the men's double scull at two world championships (1997 & 1998) coached by Reg. They took a bronze medal at the 1997 World Rowing Championships at Lac d'Aiguebelette, France.

Duncan was seated in Australian Olympic quad sculls for the 1996, 2000 and 2004 Olympic Games. He won a bronze medal at Atlanta 1996, placed fourth in Sydney and seventh in Athens.

After the Athens Games, Duncan took a year off before switching to sweep rowing and establishing a partnership with gold medallist Drew Ginn in the coxless pair. They won at the World Championships 2006 and 2007 and took the gold medal at the 2008 Summer Olympics in Beijing.

References

External links
 Australian Olympic Committee profile
 Australian Rowing History

1973 births
Living people
Australian male rowers
Olympic rowers of Australia
Rowers at the 1996 Summer Olympics
Rowers at the 2000 Summer Olympics
Rowers at the 2004 Summer Olympics
Rowers at the 2008 Summer Olympics
Olympic bronze medalists for Australia
Olympic gold medalists for Australia
Olympic medalists in rowing
Medalists at the 2008 Summer Olympics
Recipients of the Medal of the Order of Australia
Griffith University alumni
Sportspeople from Hobart
Medalists at the 1996 Summer Olympics
World Rowing Championships medalists for Australia
20th-century Australian people
21st-century Australian people